General Mohd Sany bin Abdul Ghaffar (19 January 1926 – 22 August 2015) was the 6th Chief of Defence Forces of Malaysia.

Death
Mohd Sany died on 22 August 2015 and was buried at the Armed Forces cemetery in Port Dickson, Negeri Sembilan.

Honours
 :
 Recipient of the Malaysian Commemorative Medal (Silver) (PPM) (1965)
 Companion of the Order of the Defender of the Realm (JMN) (1967)
 Commander of the Order of Loyalty to the Crown of Malaysia (PSM) – Tan Sri (1976)
 Commander of the Order of the Defender of the Realm (PMN) – Tan Sri (1978)
 :
 Commander of the Order of the Crown of Kelantan (PMK) (1968)
 :
 Knight Commander of the Order of the Perak State Crown (DPMP) – Dato' (1969)
 Knight Grand Commander of the Order of Taming Sari (SPTS) – Dato' Seri Panglima (1978)
 :
 Knight Commander of the Order of the Crown of Selangor (DPMS) – Dato' (1976)

References 

1926 births
2015 deaths
Malaysian military personnel
Companions of the Order of the Defender of the Realm
Commanders of the Order of Loyalty to the Crown of Malaysia
Commanders of the Order of the Defender of the Realm
Knights Commander of the Order of the Crown of Selangor